Admiralissimo is an informal title for a chief naval officer, usually implying supreme naval command. It does not correspond to any particular rank, probably derives from Italian, and is a naval equivalent of generalissimo.

List of senior naval officers referred to as admiralissimo
Hayreddin Barbarossa - 15th/16th century Turkish admiral
Albrecht von Wallenstein - admiral of the Baltic Sea
John Jellicoe, 1st Earl Jellicoe - British admiral of the fleet.
Lord Charles Beresford - British 19th/20th century admiral.
Augustin Boué de Lapeyrère - Commander-in-Chief of France's Mediterranean forces
George Dewey - American Admiral of the Navy
Deodoro da Fonseca

References

Naval ranks
Positions of authority
Military ranks
Italian words and phrases